Emilio González Márquez (born 12 November 1960 in Lagos de Moreno, Jalisco) is a Mexican politician affiliated with the National Action Party (PAN). He served as Governor of Jalisco.

Political career
González was an active member of the Mexican Democratic Party (PDM); he served as municipal president (mayor) of Lagos de Moreno representing the PDM (1980–1982). He resigned from the PDM in 1988.

In 1992 González joined the National Action Party (PAN) and secured a seat in the Chamber of Deputies via proportional representation.  From 1995 to 1997 he served as Regidor of the municipality of Guadalajara.  In 1997 he was elected to serve in the LVII Legislature of the Mexican Congress.  González presided over the PAN in the State of Jalisco from 1999 to 2002. In 2003 he was elected municipal president of Guadalajara; he assumed office on 1 January 2004, and left the position on 6 December 2005 seeking his party nomination for the governorship of Jalisco; he  won his party's internal bid with 55.17% of the votes.

See also
 List of municipal presidents of Guadalajara
 2006 Jalisco state election
 Governor of Jalisco
 Cabinet of Emilio González Márquez

References

1960 births
Living people
Politicians from Jalisco
Governors of Jalisco
Members of the Chamber of Deputies (Mexico)
Municipal presidents of Guadalajara, Jalisco
National Action Party (Mexico) politicians
People from Lagos de Moreno, Jalisco
21st-century Mexican politicians
University of Guadalajara alumni
Deputies of the LVII Legislature of Mexico